Genevieve Barr (born 12 December 1985) is an English actor and writer of stage and screen. She played the lead role in the BBC award-winning series The Silence. Having grown up speaking orally, Barr learned sign language for this role.

Further credits include roles playing psychopathic Lisa in Shameless, BAFTA award-winning The Fades, ITV's True Love alongside Jane Horrocks, Call the Midwife, ITV's Liar, BBC's Press and the Netflix film Been So Long.

Personal life
Barr was born deaf into a hearing family with no hereditary record of deafness, and has three younger siblings. She was fitted with hearing aids at age four and attended mainstream education at Harrogate Ladies' College, studying English and History at Edinburgh University, before graduating in 2008. A talented sportswoman, she played rounders for England at 15, was a high-board diver competing in national competitions, and captained the Edinburgh University lacrosse team, before going on to play for Scotland. Upon completion of her degree, Barr enrolled in the Teach First graduate scheme and was teaching in a secondary school in Bermondsey before commencing her acting career. Barr was married in 2016 and had her first child in 2018.

Career
In 2011, after The Silence came out, Barr went on to roles in Shameless and BBC3's award-winning drama The Fades. That was the first time Barr and Jack Thorne worked together before they were reunited with Thorne's hit play The Solid Life of Sugar Water. In 2013, Barr starred alongside Jane Horrocks in an episode of ITV's True Love, directed by Dominic Savage, and played a Victorian prostitute in the BBC production Murder on the Victorian Railway.

In 2014, Barr played June Dillon in the season 4 finale of BBC's Call the Midwife - a deaf woman who relied solely on sign language coming to terms with childbirth and the prospects of raising a deaf child. In 2016 after a long stint of theatre work, Genevieve returned to television with ITV's hit show Liar which has now been commissioned for a second season. In this, Genevieve was reunited with Harry and Jack Williams of Two Brothers Pictures. In 2017, Genevieve played the role of Features Editor Charlotte in BBC's Press. 2018 saw the release of Been So Long in cinemas and on Netflix. Barr played Artemis in the film which starred Michaela Coel and Arinze Kene and was directed by BAFTA winning director, Tinge Khrishnan.

Barr was involved in the Maltesers advert, part of a huge international campaign celebrating diversity. This was the first advert to ever be aired solely in British Sign Language with captions.
 
Her theatre work started in 2013. Genevieve played the role of Sarah on an international tour of Brian Friel's Translations, led by actor Adrian Dunbar. In 2015, she was reunited with Jack Thorne on the theatre production, The Solid Life of Sugar Water. Co-produced by Graeae, the disability-led theatre company and Plymouth Theatre Royal, it won five-star reviews and awards at the Edinburgh Festival Fringe in 2015, and went onto the National Theatre in London at the culmination of a successful tour. Shortly after, she worked with Matt Smith at the Royal Court's production of Unreachable, written and directed by Anthony Neilson. Barr was most recently seen alongside Sarah Lancashire in Jack Thorne's four parter The Accident for Channel 4. This is the last in a trilogy that includes National Treasure and Kiri.

As a writer, Barr's debut was with BBC's award-winning shorts CripTales in 2020 with Ruth Madeley playing the lead in her short film, Thunderbox. She won the prolific Red Planet Prize for ITV with her script Curio, and has co-written a single drama for BBC and Netflix with Jack Thorne, Then Barbara Met Alan released in 2022. Barr is also part of the writing team for Ralph and Katie, Peter Bowker's upcoming The A Word spinoff. In 2022, it was announced Channel 4 would produce her thriller series, I.D..

Barr, along with Katie Player and Thorne, formed a pressure group called Underlying Health Condition which aims to elevate disabled voices in the TV industry. On Friday, December 3, 2021, Underlying Health Condition was launched at an event at the Tate Modern, collaborating with other disability organizations such as Disabled Artists Networking Community, the Creative Diversity Network and 1in4 Coalition, to propose a series of measures to accommodate and support disabled artists in television.

Filmography

Television

Film

Theatre

Commercials

References

External links

1985 births
Deaf actresses
21st-century British women writers
English television writers
English television actresses
Living people
People educated at Harrogate Ladies' College
People from Harrogate
Alumni of the University of Edinburgh
English deaf people
BSL users
British women television writers